Gorgonorhynchidae is a family of worms belonging to the order Heteronemertea. The family consists of only one genus: Gorgonorhynchus Dakin & Fordham, 1931.

References

Heteronemertea
Nemertea genera